The 1960 Georgia Bulldogs football team represented the Georgia Bulldogs of the University of Georgia during the 1960 NCAA University Division football season.

Schedule

Roster
Fran Tarkenton, Sr. (C)

References

Georgia
Georgia Bulldogs football seasons
Georgia Bulldogs football